Mikko Konttila (born 18 April 1972) is a retired Finnish ice hockey player. Konttila was part of the Djurgården Swedish champions' team of 2000. Konttila made 45 Elitserien appearances for Djurgården.

References

Finnish ice hockey forwards
Djurgårdens IF Hockey players
1972 births
Living people